"It Keeps You Runnin'" is a song by the American rock band The Doobie Brothers. The song was written by band member Michael McDonald, and served as the third single from their sixth studio album Takin' It to the Streets.  It was also covered and released as a single by Carly Simon.

The Doobie Brothers version was featured in the 1994 Oscar-winning film Forrest Gump, and was included on the film's multi-platinum selling soundtrack album.

The song was also featured in the soundtrack of the 1978 film FM.

Lyrics and music
According to Allmusic critic Jason Elias, the music of "It Keeps You Runnin'" reflects a "jazzy R&B influence" and "gospel-based keyboard shading."

Elias described the lyrics as the singer "trying to talk some woman into listening to what her heart is trying to say -- the oldest trick in the book."

Reception
Ultimate Classic Rock critic Michael Gallucci rated "It Keeps You Runnin'" as the Doobie Brothers 10th greatest song, describing it as being "California-funky."

Track listing
7" single
 "It Keeps You Runnin'" – 4:20
 "Turn It Loose" – 3:53

Personnel 
 Michael McDonald – keyboards, vocals
 Patrick Simmons – guitar, backing vocals
 Jeff "Skunk" Baxter – guitar
 Tiran Porter – bass, backing vocals
 Keith Knudsen – drums, backing vocals
 John Hartman – drums

Additional Personnel 
 Ted Templeman – percussion, producer
 Bobby LaKind – congas

Charts

Carly Simon version

American singer-songwriter and musician Carly Simon covered "It Keeps You Runnin'" for her sixth studio album Another Passenger, and the song served as the lead single. Simon's version charted on both the Billboard Pop singles chart and the Billboard Adult Contemporary chart.

Billboard described it as an "interesting mid -tempo rocker" with a "jazzy feel" that has a powerful vocal performance by Simon. Billboard specifically praised the guitar playing and the hook. Cash Box said that Simon's "vocal is always clean and sensuous, and sensitive to the excellent backing," calling the song "an upbeat cut, with attractive chord changes and hook-filled lyric." Record World called it "a refreshing change of pace for the songstress who sounds very comfortable with the palpitating percussive Doobies beat."

The Doobie Brothers provided backing vocals on the track. Ted Templeman produced both Simon's and The Doobie's versions, as well as each of their albums from which the song is featured.

Personnel 
 Carly Simon – lead vocals, backing vocals
 Michael McDonald – keyboards
 Jeff Baxter – slide guitar
 Patrick Simmons – electric guitar
 Tiran Porter – bass
 John Hartman – drums
 Keith Knudsen – drums
 The Doobie Brothers – backing vocals

Track listing
7" single (US)
 "It Keeps You Runnin'" – 3:56
 "Look Me In The Eyes" – 3:34

7" single (UK)
 "It Keeps You Runnin'" – 3:56
 "Be with Me" – 1:53

Charts

References

External links
 The Doobie Brothers Official Website
 Michael McDonald's Official Website
 Carly Simon's Official Website

1976 singles
1977 singles
The Doobie Brothers songs
Carly Simon songs
Songs written by Michael McDonald (musician)
Song recordings produced by Ted Templeman
Warner Records singles
Elektra Records singles
1976 songs